Venezuela was introduced to cinema as a for-profit industry in the 1890s, when the medium became international. There were at least eight national films made in the decade, by three groups of filmmakers — one of the groups was based in Maracaibo and one was based in Caracas. The first film screening in the nation may have taken place as early as 1894, but is generally reported as 1896, with this later date being the first scheduled public screening.

Introduction and reception 
Unlike other countries where cinema came as a product of social development, cinema came to Venezuela, like most of Latin America, through two pathways; one with the locals only as the viewers, the other with them being viewed.

While some films may have been shown in the nation in 1894 and 1895 by the Kinetoscope Company on a Kinetoscope, the first scheduled, multi-show, and completely public screenings took place in 1896 with a Vitascope operated by Manuel Trujillo Durán under the employ of Méndez.:42-44 Trujillo Durán travelled around Venezuela and then onto Colombia with the Vitascope projector films, screening in Venezuela between 11 July and 29 December 1896; as he was traveling he may have acquired new films from the company to show at different locations.:44-45 By the end of the century, two other cinema devices had been used in Venezuela: the Projectoscope and the Cinematograph.:10

Reviews in contemporary newspapers of film screenings have mentioned at least some of the films being well-received; The Monroe Doctrine was said to have been popular among its Venezuelan crowd for depicting their own political reality, and had a large group of people waiting outside the Baralt Theatre to watch it,:43-44 while Muchachos bañándose en la laguna de Maracaibo was "loudly applauded" at its debut.:28 Michelle Leigh Farrell of Georgetown University also writes in general that when projectors first arrived "the theaters in Maracaibo were filled to view both domestic and imported films".:21 However, author Stephen M. Hart suggests that the Venezuelan public quickly became uninterested in the films on offer, which were mostly the actuality films typical of the time, wanting something more exciting.:13

A 1897 review of early Venezuelan films in the Maracaibo newspaper El Cronista reports on the projector being mishandled, saying that the tape seemed to stick, and mentions that the theatre was not well-lit to be able to see the film play very well.:28

Azuaga García of the Universitat de Valencia analyzes media coverage of the early film screenings, contrasting the Venezuelan treatment with that of France by describing it as very warm,:29 writing that:

Yolanda Sueiro Villanueva of Central University of Venezuela looks at the reception afforded cinema upon its later arrival in Caracas. The newspaper reviews, here, show a different class of reporting: they remark on the technological advancements required to make the show happen and on the inherent quality of the medium of film, rather than the films themselves.:10 Sueiro Villanueva writes that:

Sueiro Villanueva also describes the Caracas press' reception of the films created by Carlos Ruiz Chapellín and Ricardo Rouffet, which were shown in a circus rather than the grand theatres and halls that previous screenings had occupied::30 they were almost completely overlooked; only one newspaper mentions the films being shown, and does not elaborate beyond the titles.:71

Separate from the existing filmmaking activity, a film circuit group was established in Caracas in 1899, which included the Teatro Caracas, the Circo Metropolitano, a small bar opposite the Circo, the Café La Francia, and the Socorro bodega. After this, cinematography exhibitions appear only sparsely in Venezuela until about 1907.:31 Farrell writes that in the 1890s Venezuela was a frontrunner in the industry of film within Latin America, a status it lost after the state became involved with production in the 20th century.:20-21

National films

Influence and themes 

The films available for Venezuelans to view when the technology arrived were "predominantly foreign", with this described as "a factor of tremendous significance" in terms of the development of national film.:103:20-21 Hart looks at the French influence on the development of cinema in Venezuela; though the Lumières' representatives did not arrive in Venezuela until after the country had been exposed to many U.S. films through Méndez' Vitascope business,:42-44 Hart sees the Maracaibo-produced first films as being of the actualité genre.:13 Azuaga García describes Un célebre especialista... as "everyday", and Muchachos bañándose... as "like a view or postcard", both styles he believes are influenced by Lumière films.:29 Paul A. Schroeder Rodríguez of Amherst College agrees, denominating the Latin American body of films in this time as vistas,:22 a term literally meaning "views" and indeed used by some of the filmmakers themselves. Schroeder defines these vistas as actualités with the key element of their creators being prone to "experimentation", he claims because of their inexperience in the art.:22

Farrell asserts that the Venezuelan film industry has been "struggl[ing] against cultural imperialism [...] since the arrival of film", and has always tried to create its own identity.:19-20 Along the lines of this innovative spirit, Elisa Martínez de Badra of the Universidad Católica Andres Bello posits the argument that Ruiz and W. O. Wolcopt's partnership producing slapstick films and the "staging" of Un célebre especialista... and Muchachos bañándose... were early examples of narrative and narrative-approaching films and influenced the development of films in the region to have fictional narratives early on.:67 Though Tom Gunning of the University of Chicago identifies early Latin American cinema as spectacle, a marker of the U.S. school of filmmaking,:103 Mártinez de Badra specifically separates the first Venezuelan films from those produced by Edison.:67

A distinctly Latin American identity is further argued for by film historian Ana M. López; she also refers to the films as vistas, but notes the different context of the production. She argues that the everyday images of French actualité films would have been more thrilling and shocking for a Venezuelan audience, as they were foreign both geographically and culturally, so the Latin American productions modeled on them were culturally imbued with their own locations, traditions, and developments.:103-104 Venezuela does have some differences from its neighbors, though. One is that while López lists many of them replicating L'Arrivée d'un train en gare de La Ciotat with films featuring their own new public transportation, Venezuela cannot be counted among them.:104 Another is its inclusion in a different catalogue of thematically-linked early Latin American films in López' article; though there were a few "scientific" films, showing medical practices and including Un célebre especialista..., created to establish a more positive reputation for the medium of cinema, López writes that this practice was not as common as scholarship may see it to have been.:108-109

Regarding the question of influence and identity, Paranaguá chooses a different ground. He refers to a "tripolar circulation" of cinema inspiration, with Latin America at one point of a triangle that connects to both the United States and Europe.:20

Timeline of film screenings 

Some of the dates and film titles are dubious or questioned. Information for the pre-1897 screenings are adapted from Memorias de Venezuela vol. 10, from information published in the book Panorama histórico del cine en Venezuela (Fundación Cinemateca Nacional, 1997); the records are from newspaper archives.:44

The premiere of the first Venezuelan films, and the two other films shown, on 28 January 1897 are sourced from the introduction to Peter Rist's Historical dictionary of South American Cinema. Rodolfo Izaguirre has also suggested that more films were shown at the same time, but does not propose titles.:752 The films shown on 26 November 1897 are sourced to Azuaga García's analysis of national film. He also notes that there are records of Rouffet films mentioned in Caracas newspapers around this time, but there is "no assurance that these were presented to the public".:30

The first screenings were relatively affordable, with the typical cost being between 1 and 20 bolívares depending on the seat.:42-43:26 The equivalent in United States dollar at the time was 5.18 Bs. to US$1, giving the expenses in USD at the time as between 19c and $3.86.

Notes

References 

1890s in film
Cinema
1890s
1890s